Almost Famous is a 2000 American film.

Almost Famous may also refer to:

 Almost Famous (soundtrack), the soundtrack album to the film
 Almost Famous (musical), a 2019 musical based on the film
 Almost Famous (8Ball album), 2001
 Almost Famous (Living Legends album), 2001
 Almost Famous (Lumidee album), 2003
 Almost Famous: The Sexy Lady EP, a 2007 EP by Yung Berg
 "Almost Famous", a song from rapper Eminem's album Recovery
 "Almost Famous", a song from rapper G-Eazy's album These Things Happen
 Almost Famous, a comedy special performed by Canadian comedian Russell Peters in 2016